The IRIS Crimson (code-named Diehard2) is a Silicon Graphics (SGI) computer released in 1992. It is the world's first 64-bit workstation.

Crimson is a member of Silicon Graphics's SGI IRIS 4D series of deskside systems; it is also known as the 4D/510 workstation. It is similar to other SGI IRIS 4D deskside workstations, and can use a wide range of graphics options (up to RealityEngine). It is also available as a file server with no graphics.

This machine makes a brief appearance in the movie Jurassic Park (1993) where Lex uses the machine to navigate the IRIX filesystem in 3D using the application fsn to restore power to the compound. The next year, Silicon Graphics released a rebadged, limited edition Crimson R4400/VGXT called the Jurassic Classic, with a special logo and SGI co-founder James H. Clark's signature on the drive door.

Features
 One MIPS 100 MHz R4000 or 150 MHz R4400 processor
 Choice of seven high performance 3D graphics subsystems 
 Up to 256 MB memory and internal disk capacity up to 7.2 GB, expandable to greater than 72 GB using additional enclosures
 I/O subsystem includes four VMEbus expansion slots, Ethernet and two SCSI channels with disk striping support

Crimson memory is unique to this model.

References

External links
 IRIS Crimson

Crimson
64-bit computers